Gravest Hits is the first 12" EP by the American rock band the Cramps, compiling both sides of their first two 1978 Vengeance singles, "Surfin' Bird" and "Human Fly", with an added fifth track, a cover version of "Lonesome Town". It was released in July 1979 on Illegal Records and I.R.S. Records. The tracks were all produced by Alex Chilton and recorded at Ardent Studios in Memphis in 1977. The EP's liner notes were credited to "Dr. J.H. Sasfy, Professor of Rockology, American Rock'n'Roll Institute, Washington D.C., U.S.A.". Gravest Hits is one of the first records of both the rockabilly revival and the psychobilly genres. The photograph on the back of the original sleeve, of the band in performance, was taken at the  Palladium theater in New York.

"Human Fly" appeared in episode 4 of the UK ITV comedy drama series Married Single Other as Clint scaled four floors of a block of flats in Leeds to try to recover his relationship with Abbie. A cover version of the song by Hanni El Khatib also appeared in a Nissan television advertisement. Another cover version was recorded by the Serbian alternative rock band Supernaut on their 2006 album Eli.

Track listing
Writing credits adapted from the EP's liner notes.

Personnel
Lux Interior - vocals
Poison Ivy Rorschach - guitar
Bryan Gregory - guitar
Nick Knox - drums

References

1979 debut EPs
The Cramps albums
I.R.S. Records EPs